Metynnis hypsauchen is a species of serrasalmid found in Amazon and Paraguay river basins, as well as rivers of the Guiana Shield. It is one of the fish known as the "silver dollar" in the aquarium trade. It has frequently been confused with the very similar M. argenteus.

References

Serrasalmidae
Fish of South America
Fish of Bolivia
Fish of Brazil
Fish of Peru
Taxa named by Johannes Peter Müller
Taxa named by Franz Hermann Troschel
Fish described in 1844